Homoeosoma deceptorium is a species of snout moth in the genus Homoeosoma. It was described by Carl Heinrich in 1956. It is found in much of eastern North America, including Florida, Georgia, Illinois, Indiana, Maryland, North Carolina, Ohio, Oklahoma, Ontario and West Virginia.

References

Moths described in 1956
Phycitini